Maria Rosario "Charo" Soriano (born October 14, 1985) is a Filipino volleyball player, coach, and politician. Soriano is one of the founders of Beach Volleyball Republic, an outdoor volleyball tournament, and a board member of the Philippine National Volleyball Federation. She also serves as a city councilor of Tuguegarao since 2022.

Volleyball career
During her collegiate playing career for the Ateneo Lady Eagles, she played indoor and beach volleyball. After playing With the Ateneo Lady Eagles from 2003 to 2008, she worked as assistant coach for this team from 2012 to 2014. Soriano won with this team the Shakey's V-League Season 8, 1st Conference as head coach. In 2013, she played for the Smart Maynilad Net Spikers in the Shakey's V-League Soriano joined PLDT Home Ultera Ultra Fast Hitters from the Shakey's V-League, for the 2014 Shakey's V-League 11th Season Open Conference and the 2015 Shakey's V-League 12th Season Reinforced Open Conference. 

In beach volleyball, Soriano played in the 2015 PSL Beach Volleyball Challenge Cup with Petron XCS and the 2015 Fit To Hit: Philippine Beach Volleyball Invitational Mane 'n Tail. She won the Silver Medal in the  2015 Beach Volleyball Republic Christmas Open and later represented The Philippines partnering Alexa Micek in the 2015 Spike For Peace Women’s International Beach Volleyball. She played with Micek the Beach Volleyball Republic tournaments since 2015. She is one of the co-founders of Beach Volleyball Republic.

For the 2016 Shakey's V-League 13th Season Open Conference season, she acted as playing coach for the club  BaliPure Purest Water Defenders.

Political career
Soriano announced on October 6, 2021, that she would be seeking political office as councilor in her hometown, Tuguegarao, for the 2022 Philippine local election. She was elected to a three-year term after placing second in the official tally.

Clubs
  Ateneo Lady Eagles (2003-2008)
  Smart-Maynilad Net Spikers (2013)
  PLDT Home Ultera Ultra Fast Hitters (2014-2015)
  BaliPure Purest Water Defenders (2016)
  Perlas Spikers (2017) - team manager

Awards

Individuals
 2003-2004 UAAP Season 66 "Rookie of the Year"
 2006 Home and Away Invitational League "Best Server"
 2007 Shakey's V-League Season 4 2nd Conference "Most Energetic Player"
 2007–2008 UAAP Season 70 "Best Scorer"
 2007–2008 UAAP Season 70 "Best Receiver"
 2008 Shakey's V-League Season 5 1st Conference "Most Improved Player"
 2008 Shakey's V-League Season 5 1st Conference "Best Blocker"

See also
 Beach Volleyball Republic
 Perlas Spikers

References

Filipino women's volleyball players
Living people
Ateneo de Manila University alumni
University Athletic Association of the Philippines volleyball players
1985 births
People from Tuguegarao
Women's beach volleyball players
Wing spikers
Middle blockers
Filipino women's beach volleyball players
Filipino sportsperson-politicians
Politicians from Cagayan
21st-century Filipino women politicians
Filipino city and municipal councilors
Filipino volleyball coaches